Txakoli de Álava (Basque) or Chacolí de Álava (Spanish) is a Spanish Denominación de Origen Protegida (DOP) for wines, located around the towns of Amurrio, Llodio, Artziniega, Okondo and Aiara in the province of Álava, Basque Country, Spain.

Txacolí is a thin white acidic wine that can be naturally fizzy and is traditionally served like cider, poured from a height into the glass.

History
This DOP was created in 1989 on the initiative of the five remaining txacolí producers in the province. In that year there were only 5 ha under vines producing txacolí. However, wine had traditionally been made in this manner for hundreds of years and was popular from the Middle Ages up to the end of the 19th century, when the vines were devastated by the phylloxera and the effects of industrialization of the Basque Country.

Climate
 Maximum mean temperature: 18.7 °C
 Minimum mean temperature: 7.5 °C
 Mean temperature: 13.1 °C
 Mean annual rainfall: 900 l

Authorised Grape Varieties
The authorised grape varieties are:
 Red: Ondarribi Beltza
 White: Hondarrabi Zuri, Petit Manseng, Gros Manseng, Petit Courbu, Sauvignon Blanc, Riesling, and Chardonnay
  
Almost all the vines are trained on trellises (en espaldera) due to the high levels of rainfall and humidity in the area.

Vineyards
 There are 60 ha of vineyards registered with the D.O.
 Maximum authorized planting density: 2,500 to 3,500 vines/ha
 Maximum authorized yield: 12,500 hg/ha
 Minimum alcohol content: 9.5º%

References

External links
 D.O.P. Arabako Txakolina-Txakolí de Álava-Chacolí de Álava official website

Wine regions of Spain
Spanish wine
Appellations
Wine classification